George Smith (March 6, 1852 – July 24, 1930) was a Scottish-born lawyer and political figure in Ontario, Canada. He represented Oxford North in the House of Commons of Canada from 1905 to 1908 as a Liberal.

He was born in Cambuslang, Lanarkshire, the son of John Douglas Smith and Margaret Paton. Smith was educated at the University of Toronto and Osgoode Hall. In 1893, he married Dr. Emily Janet Irvine (1858–1932). Smith was connected with the Crown Bank of Woodstock. He was elected to the House of Commons in a 1905 by-election held following the death of James Sutherland. Smith did not run for reelection in 1908.

Authored, pseudonymously ["Clyde" Smith], The Amishmen, 1912, Toronto. Publisher, William Briggs.

The story is used as a means to convey Smith's social, political and spiritual outlook; a radical liberal, vehemently anti-war, a prototypical environmentalist, a believer in immigration, autonomous, voluntary cooperation, justice, linguistic equality and champion of women's equality and labor, among other things.

Speculation: It is likely his views were a cause for concern to the (Liberal) Laurier government. He was, however, elected by the people, and, so, was in all likelihood sinecured to a Judgeship (in Woodstock, Ontario), in an effort to silence him; thus he wrote his book under a transparent nom-de-plume.

References

Members of the House of Commons of Canada from Ontario
Liberal Party of Canada MPs
1852 births
1930 deaths